The Munich WCT was a men's tennis tournament played in Munich, West Germany from 1973–1975 and 1982-1983. The event was part of the World Championship Tennis (WCT) circuit and was held on indoor carpet courts.

Finals

Singles

Doubles

See also
 Bavarian International Tennis Championships

References

External links
 ATP archive

 
Defunct tennis tournaments in Germany
World Championship Tennis
1973 establishments in Germany
1983 disestablishments in Germany